Guo Youhua (born 1983-09-29 in Gansu) is a Chinese baseball player who is a member of Team China at the 2008 Summer Olympics.

Sports career
1997-2000 Lanzhou Sports School;
2000-2005 Gansu Provincial Sports Team B;
2004 National Team;
2005–Present Army Team

Major performances
2005 National League - 1st;
2006 Asian Games - 4th

References
Profile 2008 Olympics Team China

Baseball players at the 2008 Summer Olympics
Chinese baseball players
Olympic baseball players of China
Sportspeople from Gansu
Living people
1983 births
Baseball players at the 2006 Asian Games
Asian Games competitors for China
21st-century Chinese people